is a Japanese competitive figure skater. He currently competes in pair skating with Narumi Takahashi.

Career 
Competing in men's singles, Shibata won two gold medals on the ISU Junior Grand Prix series and qualified to two ISU Junior Grand Prix Finals. He appeared at the 2003 and 2006 World Junior Championships, finishing 12th both times, and at three senior Grand Prix events. He retired in 2010.

On May 18, 2016, it was announced that Shibata had formed a pair skating partnership with Narumi Takahashi and that they would train in Chicago.

The Japanese media called Shibata "the Japanese Johnny Weir". He was able to perform a Biellmann spin in competition.

Programs

Competitive highlights
GP: Grand Prix; JGP: Junior Grand Prix

Pairs with Takahashi

Men's singles

References

External links

 
 

Japanese male single skaters
Japanese male pair skaters
Figure skaters at the 2017 Asian Winter Games
Asian Games competitors for Japan
1987 births
Living people
Sportspeople from Hokkaido
People from Kushiro, Hokkaido